Joseph Wanton (1705–1780) was governor of Rhode Island.

Joseph Wanton may also refer to:

 Joseph Wanton Jr. (1733–1780), Loyalist in the American Revolution, deputy governor of Rhode Island
 Joseph Wanton Morrison (1783–1826), British soldier